Dominik Božak (born 30 April 1991) is a Croatian football forward who plays for Bednja.

Club career
He has two different spells in the Austrian lower leagues with SK Unterschützen and UFC Markt Allhau.

References

External links
PrvaLiga profile 

1991 births
Living people
Sportspeople from Varaždin
Association football forwards
Croatian footballers

NK Ivančica players
NK Zavrč players
Slovenian PrvaLiga players
Croatian expatriate footballers
Croatian expatriate sportspeople in Austria
Expatriate footballers in Austria
Croatian expatriate sportspeople in Slovenia
Expatriate footballers in Slovenia